The Dolma Festival in Armenia, also known as Uduli, is an annual festival that is held annually near the city of Armavir, Armenia. It began in 2011 and focuses on appreciation of Armenian cuisine, especially dolma, a traditional Armenian dish made of ground beef, lamb and spices wrapped in grape leaves, cabbage leaves and vegetables.

During the festival, chefs from Armenia and other countries aim to cook different kinds of stuffed vegetable dishes known as dolma. During the competition, festival guests can watch Armenian dances, listen to songs, and taste the dolma. At the end of the festival, a jury chooses the best chef. The winner gets a special prize — a golden statue.

Armenian cuisine uses many spices and herbs, including salt, garlic, red pepper, dried mint (in Western Armenia), cumin, coriander, sumac, cinnamon, cloves and mahleb.

Dolma 

Dolma is one of the most popular dish in Armenian culture. Dolma is prepared from minced lamb or beef mixed with rice, fresh herbs and spices, wrapped in grape or cabbage leaves. Armenians use seasonings such as coriander, dill, mint, pepper and cinnamon. The taste of the dolma varies in each region, including Artamet, Alashkert, Echmiadzin, Mush and others.

History 
The festival was founded in 2011, and from then onward was held in the villages of Musaler and Hnaberd, next to the ruins of the old Armenian capital, Dvin.

Gallery

References

Festivals in Armenia
Food and drink festivals